Starý Kolín is a municipality and village in Kolín District in the Central Bohemian Region of the Czech Republic. It has about 1,700 inhabitants.

Administrative parts
The village of Bašta is an administrative part of Starý Kolín.

Etymology
The name Kolín probably comes from the Old Czech verb koliti, i.e. "to hammer poles", and is related to the location of Starý Kolín in the often flooded area at the confluence of Klejnárka and Elbe. The soil in the vicinity of the confluence was strengthened with the help of wooden poles.

Geography
It lies in a fertile landscape of the Central Elbe Table lowland. It is located on the left bank of the Elbe River, at the confluence of the rivers Elbe and Klejnárka.

History
The first written mention of Starý Kolín is from 1267, when the Church of Saint Andrew was consecrated. Although it is documented later than Kolín, the adjective starý (i.e. "old") indicates that it is older than Kolín. Starý Kolín was owned by various burghers until 1547, when Emperor Ferdinand I confiscated it and joined it to the Kolín estate.

Sights
The landmark of Starý Kolín is the Church of Saint Andrew. The current church was built in 1731–1740, after the old church was destroyed by a fire.

Notable people
Josef Paleček (born 1949), ice hockey player and coach

References

External links

Villages in Kolín District